Afzalpur is a panchayat town in Kalaburagi district in the Indian state of Karnataka. It is also the headquarters of the Afzalpur taluk.

Geography
It has an average elevation of 408 metres (1338 feet). The town is spread over an area of 3 km².

Afzalpur Taluk borders Aland taluk of Kalaburagi district to the north, Gulbarga taluk of Kalaburagi district to the east, Jevargi taluk of Gulbarga district and Sindgi taluk of Bijapur district to the south, Indi Taluk of Bijapur district to the west and Akalkot Taluk of Solapur district of Maharashtra to the north-west.

Bhima and Amarja rivers flow through this taluk.

Demographics 
 India census, Afzalpur Town Panchayat has population of 27,088 of which 13,892 are males while 13,196 are females as per report released by Census India 2011

Afzalpur religion data 2011 
Population, 27,088

Hindu, 75.95%

Muslim, 23.56%

References 

Cities and towns in Kalaburagi district